Goran Stankovski (born 20 November 1976) is a Macedonian football coach and former player who played as a striker.

Club career
Stankovski had two seasons with German second tier TeBe Berlin at the end of the 1990s. He then spent the 2005/06 season in the Belgian second tier with FC Antwerp.

International career
He made his senior debut for Macedonia in a September 1998 friendly match against Egypt and has earned a total of 3 caps, scoring no goals. His final international was a June 2003 European Championship qualification match away against Turkey.

Personal life
Stankovski's son, Luka, is also a professional footballer.

References

External links 
 
 Goran Stankovski at HKFA
 Profile at Antwerpsupporter.be 

1976 births
Living people
Footballers from Skopje
Association football midfielders
Macedonian footballers
North Macedonia international footballers
FK Sloga Jugomagnat players
Tennis Borussia Berlin players
FK Rabotnički players
Royal Antwerp F.C. players
FK Makedonija Gjorče Petrov players
Kitchee SC players
FC Sibir Novosibirsk players
Diyarbakırspor footballers
FC Dacia Chișinău players
FK Drita players
FK Shkupi players
Hong Kong First Division League players
Macedonian First Football League players
2. Bundesliga players
Regionalliga players
Challenger Pro League players
Hong Kong Premier League players
Hong Kong League XI representative players
Russian First League players
Süper Lig players
Moldovan Super Liga players
Macedonian Second Football League players
Macedonian expatriate footballers
Expatriate footballers in Germany
Macedonian expatriate sportspeople in Germany
Expatriate footballers in Belgium
Macedonian expatriate sportspeople in Belgium
Expatriate footballers in Hong Kong
Expatriate footballers in Russia
Macedonian expatriate sportspeople in Russia
Expatriate footballers in Turkey
Macedonian expatriate sportspeople in Turkey
Expatriate footballers in Moldova
Macedonian expatriate sportspeople in Moldova
Macedonian football managers
FK Rabotnički managers